Anilios fossor, also known as the miner blind snake, is a species of blind snake that is endemic to Australia. The specific epithet fossor (“digger”) refers to the snake's fossorial habits as well as to the type locality.

Description
The species grows to about 29 cm in length.

Behaviour
The species is oviparous.

Distribution and habitat
The snake is found in the south-eastern Northern Territory in the vicinity of the Hale River. The habitat is Eucalyptus camaldulensis riverine woodland on sandy loam soils. The type locality is the Ruby Gap Nature Park, where the Northern Territory's first mining rush took place, following the discovery of garnets (misidentified as rubies) in the bed of the river.

References

 
fossor
Snakes of Australia
Reptiles of the Northern Territory
Reptiles described in 2015